Puteri Indonesia ('Princess of Indonesia') is a national beauty pageant in Indonesia that selects the winners to represent the country in one of the Big Four major international beauty pageants; namely Miss International. The pageant also selects representative for Miss Supranational pageant. Puteri Indonesia is traditionally held in March, alongside the celebration of International Women's Day.

The 25th Puteri Indonesia is Laksmi Shari De-Neefe Suardana of Bali who was crowned on 27 May 2022 at Jakarta Convention Center, Jakarta, Indonesia. She represented Indonesia at the 71st edition of Miss Universe beauty pageant. 

In 2023, Puteri Indonesia lost the rights to select and send the Indonesian representative to the Miss Universe competition.

History

The president-owner of Puteri Indonesia are The Royal Highest Family of Surakarta Sunanate, Princess Mooryati Soedibyo and Princess Putri Kuswisnuwardhani. The pageant was established in 1992 and is considered as the oldest national beauty pageant in Indonesia, with the first Puteri Indonesia being Indira Paramarini Sudiro who was crowned as Puteri Indonesia 1992 and won Miss ASEAN 1992 title. Where Puteri Indonesia 1996, Alya Rohali was held her title for the longest reign in the pageant history, from 1996 to 1999.

Puteri Indonesia was founded to choose the winner for Miss Universe in 1993, but by 1996, the winner was forced to withdraw from competing at the Miss Universe pageant by the former First Lady, Mrs. Tien Suharto who was the wife of the late second president of the Republic of Indonesia, Suharto. Puteri Indonesia winner was again sent to the Miss Universe, Miss International and Miss Supranational, after receive a big supports and permissions from Megawati Soekarnoputri who was chosen as the first-ever Female President of Indonesia. Since then Puteri Indonesia pageant was held consecutively every year and the winner was sent to the International Beauty pageants, started with Artika Sari Devi Kusmayadi who was representing Indonesia at the Miss Universe 2005 in Thailand, following with Rahma Landy Sjahruddin at the Miss International 2007 in Japan, Alessandra Khadijah Usman at the Miss Asia Pacific World 2011 in Chile and later on 2013 Cokorda Istri Krisnanda Widani was competed at the Miss Supranational 2013 in Belarus.

The Puteri Indonesia pageant is traditionally held in March, alongside the celebration for International Women's Day. Puteri Indonesia is held annually to crown three main winners, namely Puteri Indonesia (Miss Universe Indonesia), Puteri Indonesia Lingkungan (Miss International Indonesia) and Puteri Indonesia Pariwisata (Miss Supranational Indonesia); each will represent Indonesia in their respective international beauty pageant. The candidates selection of Puteri Indonesia started from the provincial level, the chosen candidates will be compete in national pageant, held annually in Jakarta. Usually every year, the winner of Miss Universe, Miss International and Miss Supranational attended the prestigious crowning of Puteri Indonesia as the main guest stars. Puteri Indonesia Organization is widely supported by the President and Cabinet of the Republic of Indonesia. In 2019, Joko Widodo announced the Puteri Indonesia as National Intangible Cultural Heritage of Indonesia, which carries the values of Indonesian culture and society togetherness, to celebrate the role of women in the creative industry, environment, tourism, education and social awareness. Generally, the final coronation night of the pageant was annually broadcast on Indosiar, but the 2007 and 2019–present edition was broadcast on SCTV, which means both of SCM Network Televisions is the official broadcaster of Puteri Indonesia. In February 2023, Puteri Indonesia Organization lost its Miss Universe license.

International crowns

The following are the Puteri Indonesia titleholders throughout the years, including the highlights of their performance in Big Four, Sub-major international beauty pageants, and Minor international beauty pageants.

Winner at Big Four international beauty pageants:
 One – Miss International winner: Kevin Lilliana Junaedy (2017)
Winner at Sub-major international beauty pageants:
 One – Miss Grand International winner: Ariska Putri Pertiwi (2016)

Placements at international pageants
The following are the placements of Puteri Indonesia titleholders for their participation at international pageants throughout the years.

Placements at Big Four international beauty pageants:
 8 placements at Miss Universe (2005, 2013, 2014, 2015, 2016, 2018, 2019, 2020). The highest placement is Frederika Alexis Cull as Top 10 Miss Universe 2019
 6 placements at Miss International (2007, 2014, 2016, 2017, 2018, 2019). The highest placement is Kevin Lilliana Junaedy as Miss International 2017
Placements at Sub-major international beauty pageants:
 7 placements at Miss Supranational (2013, 2016, 2017, 2018, 2019, 2021, 2022). The highest placement is Jesica Fitriana Martasari as 2nd Runner-up Miss Supranational 2019
 2 placements at Miss Grand International (2016 and 2017). The highest placement is Ariska Putri Pertiwi as Miss Grand International 2016
Placements at Minor international beauty pageants:
 2 placements at Miss Asia Pacific World (2011 and 2012). The highest placement is Alessandra Khadijah Usman as 1st Runner-up Miss Asia Pacific World 2011

Awards

The attribute awards that most frequently presented at the Puteri Indonesia editions each year:

CURRENT
 Puteri Indonesia Persahabatan (Miss Congeniality) (1992–present) 
 Puteri Indonesia Berbakat (Miss Talent) (1992–present)
 Puteri Indonesia Intelegensia (Miss Intelligence – all of three winners of Puteri Indonesia Intelegensia will receive the master degree full scholarship programs) (1995–present)
 Best Traditional Costume (2002, 2015–present)
 Best Evening Gown (2018–present)
 Puteri Indonesia Digital & Sosial Media (People's Choice Award – voting through Puteri Indonesia Website and Social Media) (2020–present)
 Puteri Indonesia Kepulauan (Favorite Island's Princesses) (2007–present)
Puteri Indonesia Sumatera (Sumatra)
Puteri Indonesia Jawa (Java)
Puteri Indonesia Bali Nusa Tenggara (Lesser Sunda Islands)
Puteri Indonesia Kalimantan (Borneo)
Puteri Indonesia Sulawesi (Celebes)
Puteri Indonesia Timur (Eastern Indonesia)

PAST
 Puteri Indonesia Favorit (People's Choice Award) (1992–2011)
 Puteri Indonesia Fotogenik (Miss Photogenic) (1992–2001)
 Puteri Indonesia Lingkungan (Miss Environment) (1993–1996, 2004–2005)
 Puteri Indonesia Pariwisata (Miss Tourism) (1994–1996, 2004–2005)

Titles

Note that the year designates the time Puteri Indonesia has acquired that particular pageant franchise.

Current
 Miss International (2007–present)
 Miss Supranational (2013–present)
 Miss Charm (2024–present)

Past
 Miss Universe (1992–2022)
 Miss World (2005)
 Miss Grand International (2013, 2016–2017)
 Miss Asia Pacific World (2011–2012)
 World Miss University (1995)

Awarding of winners
The Puteri Indonesia Organization is the organization that currently owns and runs the Puteri Indonesia beauty contest which also give the Puteri Indonesia Lingkungan and Puteri Indonesia Pariwisata titles for the 1st Runner-up and 2nd Runner-up of Puteri Indonesia in the end of the competition. Based in Jakarta, the organization is owned by Puteri Indonesia Charities, Inc. The current president is The Royal Highest Princess Mooryati Soedibyo of Surakarta Sunanate. The following is the Puteri Indonesia titleholders from 1992–present with their specific titles.
Puteri Indonesia (1992–present)
Puteri Indonesia Lingkungan (2006–present)
Puteri Indonesia Pariwisata (2006–present)
Puteri Indonesia Perdamaian (2016–2018)

Gallery of winners

Details

Puteri Indonesia

In addition to crowning the new Puteri Indonesia, at the end of election night event, Puteri Indonesia will elect the princesses as determined by the judges. Until 2022, The Puteri Indonesia winner automatically became Miss Universe Indonesia to represent Indonesia at the Miss Universe pageant. Began in 2023, the main winner of Puteri Indonesia allocated to Miss International pageant.

No contest in 1993, 1997–1999, 2012, and 2021.

First Runner-up

Color key

In addition to crowning the new Puteri Indonesia, at the end of election night event, Puteri Indonesia will elect the princesses as determined by the judges. The Puteri Indonesia Lingkungan 2006 winner was titled to Miss Asia Pacific International in 2007 but after the pageant canceled many times the International competition moved to Miss International. Began 2008 The Puteri Indonesia Lingkungan winner automatically becomes Miss International Indonesia and represents Indonesia at the Miss International pageant since 2008. After loosing Miss Universe franchise in 2023, the first runner-up will move to Miss Supranational pageant and renamed as Puteri Indonesia Pariwisata.

No contest in 1993, 1997–1999, 2012, and 2021.

Second Runner-up

Color key

In addition to crowning the new Puteri Indonesia, at the end of election night event, Puteri Indonesia will elect the princesses as determined by the judges. The Puteri Indonesia Pariwisata winner automatically becomes Miss Supranational Indonesia and represents Indonesia at the Miss Supranational pageant since 2013, before was represent at Miss Asia Pacific World in 2011-2012. After loosing Miss Universe franchise in 2023, Puteri Indonesia reached out the new license of Miss Charm. The second runner-up will compete to Miss Charm pageant and renamed as Puteri Indonesia Lingkungan.

No contest in 1993, 1997–1999, 2012, and 2021.

Top 5 or 6 Finalists
Color key

In 1992–1996 the 3rd Runner-up announced at the Puteri Indonesia contest. Since 2000 the rule makes in the Top 6 or Top 5 and then runners-up will be calling. Beside on Top 3 Puteri Indonesia who focus in Miss Universe, Miss International and Miss Supranational Pageants, since 2013 for the first time, the 3rd Runner-up selected to compete at the Miss Grand International pageant. In 2016, Puteri Indonesia has signed to be national franchise of Miss Grand International again after the pageant dropped Miss Grand International in 2014. In 2017, the Puteri Indonesia Foundation decided to name their 3rd Runner-up as "Puteri Indonesia Perdamaian". The title aims to be an Ambassador of Peace under Puteri Indonesia.

No contest in 1993, 1997–1999, 2012, and 2021.

Before Puteri Indonesia

Color key

Below are the Indonesian representatives to the most prestigious pageant in 1960–1983 before Yayasan Puteri Indonesia (YPI) took the licenses in 1992. In 1974–1983, Indonesian representatives crowned from closed election in under Indonesia beauty management in that era.

Miss Universe Indonesia

Miss World Indonesia

Miss International Indonesia

Miss Asia Pacific Indonesia

Queen of the Pacific Indonesia

Miss Young International Indonesia

World Miss University Indonesia

Miss Charming International Indonesia

Miss Charm Indonesia

See also

Miss International
Miss Supranational
Puteri Indonesia Lingkungan
Puteri Indonesia Pariwisata
Miss Indonesia
Miss Earth Indonesia
Miss Mega Bintang Indonesia
Miss Universe Indonesia
Indonesia at major beauty pageants

References

External links
 
 

Puteri Indonesia
Beauty pageants in Indonesia
Recurring events established in 1992
Organizations established in 1992
1992 establishments in Indonesia
Indonesia
Indonesia
Indonesia
Indonesian awards
Lists of award winners
Lists of women in beauty pageants